Chris Chataway (born ) is an Australian Anglican priest and musician who has served as Dean of Perth since 1 February 2020. He previously served as Archdeacon and  Dean of Ballarat from 2014 to 2020.

References

Deans of Ballarat
Deans of Perth
Archdeacons of Ballarat
Living people
1960s births
Year of birth missing (living people)